Guangji Temple is a Buddhist temple located on the hillside of Mount Heng of Hengyang, Hunan, China.

History
Guangji Temple was first established in 1595 by Master Wu'ai, in the 23rd year of Wanli period of the Ming dynasty (1368-1644), and initially called Qingliang Temple. In the temple the statue of Vairocana was enshrined, Vairocana, also called  in Chinese, so the temple also known as Pifodong.

In 1658, master Zhu'an, the disciple of master Wu'ai, renovated the temple and renamed it "Guangji Temple". During the Kangxi period of Qing dynasty (1644-1911), masters Zhili and Longshan, disciples of master Zhu'an, extended the temple.

Gallery

References

Buddhist temples in Hunan
Hengshan County